Kinkala is a district in the Pool Region of south-eastern Republic of the Congo. The capital lies at Kinkala.

localization: at 70 km of south area of Brazzaville

Population = 68812

Mobile Operators = CELTEL and MTN

Towns and villages

Pool Department
Districts of the Republic of the Congo